Jorge Campos Asensi is a Spanish politician and a member of the Parliament of the Balearic Islands representing the Vox since 2019 in which he was elected on a joint ticket with the localist Actua Baleares party. He is also leader of Vox in the Balearic Islands.

Biography
Campos was born in Palma de Mallorca. He studied law at the University of the Balearic Islands before completing a master's degree in environmental science at the University of Valencia.

He was the founder of the Círculo Balear Cultural Society pressure group which aimed to promote and protect the cultural and political rights and freedoms of the inhabitants of the Beleric Islands. The group was headquartered in Palma de Mallorca. In 2018, the group was converted into a political party Actúa Baleares (Citizen Alternative for Tolerance, Unity and Action). Ahead of the 2019 Balearic regional election, the party announced its intention to run on a joint list with Vox. Campos was elected to the parliament and subsequently became the chairman and leader of Vox on the Balearic Islands.

References

1975 births
Living people
Members of the Parliament of the Balearic Islands
Vox (political party) politicians
People from Palma de Mallorca
21st-century Spanish politicians
University of the Balearic Islands alumni
University of Valencia alumni